A tollbooth (or toll booth) is an enclosure placed along a toll road that is used for the purpose of collecting a toll from passing traffic. A structure consisting of several tollbooths placed next to each other is called a toll plaza, tollgate, or toll station. They have historically been staffed by transportation agents who manually collect the toll, but, in the modern day, many have been replaced with automatic electronic toll collection systems, such as E-ZPass in the Northeastern United States.

Replacement 

In the 21st century, electronic toll collection systems have replaced the former locations of tollbooths around the world. Benefits of automatic toll collection include saving motorists time and money compared to traditional tollbooths.

The COVID-19 pandemic led to further losses of tollbooths, causing the state of Maryland to accelerate its shift towards all-electronic tolling by eliminating all cash payments from toll facilities. Similarly, the Pennsylvania Turnpike accelerated its plan to move to all-electronic tolling. While tollbooths are currently still in place throughout the turnpike system, signs inform drivers to keep moving through toll plaza, "we bill you".

See also 

 Electronic toll collection
 Lane control lights
 Traffic light
 Tollhouse
 Toll plaza
 Toll road

References 

Booth
Transport buildings and structures